Leva may refer to:
 Bulgarian lev, Bulgarian currency
 Leva (grasshopper), a genus of insects
 Levice, a town in Slovakia